Leave It to Binky is a teen-humor comic book series published by DC Comics that ran for 82 issues, first appearing in 1948 and wrapping up in 1977.

Publication history
The adventures of teenager Binky Biggs started in DC Comics' Leave It to Binky #1 (cover-dated March 1948), which ran for 60 issues through 1958.

The series was revived in Showcase #70 (Sept 1967), which was popular enough to bring the series back, resuming with issue #61 in July 1968. With issue #72 (May 1970), the title was shortened to Binky and the series ran until issue #81 (Nov. 1971). The entire DC humor line was cancelled between 1971 and 1972, including Leave It to Binky, Date with Debbi and Swing with Scooter.

The comic was briefly revived for issue #82 in Summer 1977. 

A spin-off title, Binky's Buddies, ran 12 issues (Feb. 1969 - Dec. 1970).

Scribbly the Boy Cartoonist appeared in some issues as a backup feature.

Awards
Artist Henry Scarpelli won a 1970 Shazam Award for Best Inker (Humor Division) for his work on this series, Date With Debbi, and other DC comics.

References

External links
 Leave It to Binky at Don Markstein's Toonopedia. Archived from the original on June 11, 2015.

1948 comics debuts
1958 comics endings
1968 comics debuts
1977 comics endings
DC Comics titles
Teen comedy comics